Charles Richardson (16 February 1817 at Woodford, Essex, United Kingdom  30 January 1890 at Newton Abbot, Devon) was the founder of the family Brick and Cement Firm A & WT Richardson Ltd, which lasted over 100 years. On 18 October 1840 he married Selina Ellis at Lambeth.  The couple had one daughter, Selina Richardson born March 1842 and four sons - Alexander R Richardson born 1847, Walter T Richardson born 1849, Frederick Charles  Richardson born 1851 and George Canning Richardson born March 1855.

Company history
The business was founded by Charles Richardson in 1850 with wharves and offices at Vauxhall, (Brunswick Lodge)  and Paddington. These premises being the London points of distribution for the London stock bricks and red facing bricks manufactured at Teynham in Kent and at Wood Lane, Shepherd's Bush. Portland cement and Roman cement manufactured at Conyers Quay near Sittingbourne were also handled here.

Charles Richardson commenced business immediately after the repeal of the brick tax which lasted from 1784–1850 and following the demand created for the then "new" Portland Cement first discovered in 1824 by William Aspdin a bricklayer of Leeds.
The White City at Shepherd's Bush now occupies the old site of the Wood Lane Brickworks.

Customers
More than a million stock bricks were supplied for the foundations of the Albert Memorial. Later, the Company also supplied the bricks used in the foundation of Eros, when that statue by Alfred Gilbert was replaced in Piccadilly Circus.

Early in the 19th century, bricks and Portland cement were also supplied for the Oval cricket ground at Kennington, while much of the early production of cement from the Conyer Works was exported to New Zealand, where the high quality of the product won the Silver Medal at the New Zealand International Exhibition in 1882.

The Company ceased production of cement at Conyer in 1906  and of bricks at Teynham in 1919, but in 1945 with the acquisition of the Auclaye Brickfields Limited, were again producing multi-coloured stock bricks, the bulk of which were supplied to help meet the needs of London's post-war housing problems, many millions being used by the London County Council and the Ministry of Works.

There were premises at the LMS Railway Goods Depot, Wandsworth Road, London SW8.

Succession
On his death, the founder of the Company was succeeded by his two sons, Mr Alexander R and Mr Walter T Richardson and a partnership formed, to be known by the title of A & W T Richardson until, following the death of Mr Alec Richardson, the firm was formed into a private limited company in 1923, having as its first board of Directors, Mrs A E Watson, Mr Alfred Jefferies Richardson, Mr H W Worsfold and Mr R E Moores, under the Joint Managing Directorship of Admiral C R Watson CMG CIE and Colonel Charles Richardson.

Three members of the family Mrs N M Monsell and Mrs A Sich - granddaughters of the founder, and Mr John W Sich - great grandson, then served the board under the Managing Director Colonel C Richardson - grandson of the founder.

Sailing barges
Charles along with Rowlie Richardson had several Thames sailing barges most named after family members;

References

1819 births
1878 deaths
Thames sailing barges
People from Woodford, London
19th-century English businesspeople